Horacio Zeballos was the defending champion but chose not to defend his title.

Cedrik-Marcel Stebe won the title after defeating Laslo Đere 6–0, 6–3 in the final.

Seeds

Draw

Finals

Top half

Bottom half

References
Main Draw
Qualifying Draw

Poprad-Tatry ATP Challenger Tour - Singles
2017 Singles